Penny Flanagan (born 1970) is an Australian singer and author.

Early life
Flanagan attended high school at Monte Sant' Angelo Mercy College and is a Sydney-based singer, songwriter, musician and novelist.

Her musical career began in 1989 as one half of the folk-pop duo Club Hoy. The duo released the 1991 album Thursday's Fortune before Flanagan went solo.

Career
The first single from her debut album, Bravado, was "Lap It Up" which hit No. 52 in the Triple J Hottest 100, 1994. The album was produced by Martin Armiger and featured Paul Hester from Crowded House on drums.

She also received significant radio and MTV play for her cover of Prince's "When You Were Mine" from her EP Seven Flights Up which was released on her own independent label, Penny Dreadful Records.

In 1997, she contributed an offbeat cover of Kylie Minogue's "Better the Devil You Know" to the soundtrack of the Australian film Dust Off The Wings and released a music video for the song that aired on MTV and Rage.

Her next release, Light Sleeper, was praised by Australian Rolling Stone Australia magazine as "a mature and intelligent release from a genuine talent, deserving of wider success." The album was produced by Tim Powles of the Church and featured a duet with Steve Kilbey on the track "Into the Sun". After the release of Light Sleeper she retreated from performing to focus on raising her three children.

She has also written three books, the novels Sing to Me and Surviving Hal, and children's book Changing The Sky.

Personal life
Her father, John Flanagan, is an Australian author best known for the Ranger's Apprentice novel series. She is the sister of actress and comedian Kitty Flanagan and since 2010 has toured with Kitty as part of her stand-up comedy shows. She writes original music for and performs songs in Kitty's show. 
 She also has a brother, who is a chef and runs a coffee shop in the snowfields of Japan.

Discography
 Bravado (1994)
 Seven Flights Up (1996)
 Light Sleeper (1998)

References

External links
 Penny @ Last.fm
 Penny @ AMO
 Club Hoy "Not Like That" on YouTube]
 Official Facebook page

1970 births
Living people
20th-century Australian novelists
Australian children's writers
Australian women novelists
Australian singer-songwriters
Singers from Sydney
20th-century Australian women writers
21st-century Australian singers
21st-century Australian women singers
People educated at Monte Sant'Angelo Mercy College
21st-century Australian women writers
21st-century Australian writers
Australian women singer-songwriters